Zaki Alhadif (1890 – October 27 1938) was a Sephardic Jewish politician in Mandatory Palestine who served as the mayor of Tiberias.

Alhadif was elected to power in October 1929. He was one of the signatories to an open letter calling for the 1929 Palestine riots to end.

Alhadif administrated Tiberias during the 1938 Tiberias massacre, and was assassinated on October 27 that year.

Alhadif was a supporter of Zionism.

References 

1890 births
1938 deaths
People from Tiberias
1938 murders in Asia
Sephardi Jews in Mandatory Palestine
Sephardi Jews in Ottoman Palestine
Jewish mayors

Assassinated Jews
People of the 1936–1939 Arab revolt in Palestine
1929 Palestine riots
Zionist activists
Zionism in Mandatory Palestine
People murdered in Mandatory Palestine

Assassinated mayors